The 2015–16 Hawaii Rainbow Warriors basketball team represented the University of Hawaii at Manoa during the 2015–16 NCAA Division I men's basketball season. The Rainbow Warriors, led by first year head coach Eran Ganot, played their home games at the Stan Sheriff Center, and were members of the Big West Conference. They finished the season 28–6, 13–3 in Big West play to tie for the Big West regular season championship. They beat Cal State Fullerton, UC Santa Barbara, and Long Beach State to become champions of the Big West tournament and earn the conference's automatic bid to the NCAA tournament. As a #13 seed, they defeated #4 seeded California in the first round for the school's first ever victory in the NCAA Tournament. They fell to Maryland in the second round.

In December, the NCAA placed a postseason ban on Hawaii for the 2017 season and reduced scholarships through 2018 for improper benefits and actions by the school.

It was also the first time since 1997-98 that there were two sellouts in the same season.

Previous season 
The Rainbow Warriors finished the 2014–15 season 22–13, 8–8 in Big West play to finish in fifth place. They lost to UC Irvine in the finals of the Big West tournament.

Roster

Schedule and Results
Source:

|-
!colspan=9 style="background:#004231; color:white;"| Exhibition

|-
!colspan=9 style="background:#004231; color:white;"| Non-conference games

|-
!colspan=9 style="background:#004231; color:white"| Big West Conference games

|-
!colspan=9 style="background:#004231; color:white;"| Big West tournament

|-
!colspan=9 style="background:#004231; color:white;"| NCAA tournament

Rankings

*AP does not release post-NCAA tournament rankings

References

Hawaii Rainbow Warriors basketball seasons
Hawai'i
Hawai'i
Rain
Rain